Koneko ("kitten" in Japanese) is a cat cafe located on the Lower East Side of Manhattan. The cafe's format is based on Japanese cat cafes, and positions itself as "America's first Japanese-inspired Cat Cafe." Koneko is partnered with Anjellicle Cats Rescue, a non-profit rescue organization based in New York City that specializes in pulling cats from the city's euthanasia shelters. All of the felines at Koneko are adoptable.

Koneko was founded by Benjamin Kalb, a chef who worked previously at Bouley and Momofuku Noodle Bar.

References

Charities based in New York City
2015 establishments in New York City
Cat organizations
Animal welfare organizations based in the United States
Japanese-American culture in New York City